Tad-Magitl is a selo and the administrative centre of Tad-Magitlinsky Selsoviet, Akhvakhsky District, Republic of Dagestan, Russia. The population was 1,212 in 2010. There are three streets.

Geography 
Tad-Magitl is located on the Lologonitltlar River, one kilometre west of Karata (the district's administrative centre) by road.

References 

Rural localities in Akhvakhsky District